Redmond High School (RHS) is a four-year public high school located in Redmond, Washington, one of four high schools in the Lake Washington School District (LWSD). Opened in 1964, Redmond High School is the second oldest high school in the Lake Washington School District.  Redmond Middle School, Timberline Middle School, and Evergreen Middle School (grades 6–8) feed into Redmond High School (grades 9–12).

Redmond High School sits atop Education Hill in Redmond, in an updated building which opened in 2003 with a two-story structure that features many environmentally friendly energy alternatives such as a large photovoltaic array and a state-of the-art geothermal heating system.  The original building opened in 1964 and underwent extensive remodelling during the 1983–84 and 2011-2012 school years.

As of 2020, the principal of Redmond High School is Jill VanderVeer and the three assistant principals are Andrew Hosford, Rob Jones, and Colette Roche. Jill VanderVeer entered her position at the start of the 2019-20 school year, replacing the former principal Jane Todd, who was principal from 2006 to 2019, replacing Brian Hunter, who was principal until 2006.

Academics

Redmond High School offers classes throughout a diverse range of academic and artistic subjects, including Biology, Chemistry, Physics, Calculus, World History, American History, Physical Education, Photography, Studio Art, and Anatomy & Physiology. Students have the option of taking Regular, Honors, or Advanced Placement (AP) classes in most key subject areas. RHS consistently has strong showings on standardized tests including Measures of Student Progress (MSP) and High School Proficiency Exams (HSPEs). The school consistently has graduation rates over 90%.

In 2013, Redmond High School produced 17 National Merit Semifinalists. The school has also had students become Semifinalists in both the Siemens Competition (2012) and the Intel Science Talent Search (2014).

Paula Ferguson, the orchestra director at RHS, received the Symetra Heroes in the Classroom Award in 2012 for outstanding leadership and instructional skills. Sandy Hargraves, a math teacher, received the Edyth May Sliffe Award for Distinguished High School Mathematics Teaching in 2009. Brian Anderson, an English teacher, received the Golden Apple Award in 2006 for excellence in teaching.

Mike Town, the former AP Environmental Science teacher, and five students were presented the Presidential Environmental Youth Awards by President George W. Bush in 2008 for leading the "Cool Schools Program," which resulted in the reduction of over $550,000 of energy and waste costs for the district, through conservation measures. Town also received the Green Prize in Public Education by the NEA for the program, which has prevented the emission of 1.5 million tons of carbon dioxide, and has since included over 150 schools worldwide.

In June 2019, Redmond High School won several awards in its participation in Microsoft's annual Hunt the Wumpus competition. One team took home the first place trophy for "Most Innovative.". Another team won second place for "Best Implementation." These groups worked over a period of several months in preparation for this annual event.

Performing arts

The Performing Arts Center (otherwise known as the PAC) showcases performances by the RHS Concert and Jazz Choirs (formerly directed by Jackson Pinder, currently directed by Julian Fajardo),  the Concert and Jazz Bands (currently directed by Andrew Robertson), Chamber, String, and Symphonic Orchestras (currently directed by Camille Gates), and musicals and plays by Redmond Drama (led by Danika Drake). Redmond's Music Department attends competitions and festivals throughout the region annually, including the PLU Orchestra Invitational, and the 'Music in the Parks' festival at Disneyland and Silverwood Theme Parks. In 2009 and 2013, Redmond High School orchestras performed at Carnegie Hall, and they returned joined with the Jazz Ensemble in 2016. Several years, students in the band program have been selected to march in the Macy's Thanksgiving Day Parade. The PAC is also the performing venue for the Eastside Symphony.

Organizations
Over 44 student organizations exist at Redmond High School, ranging from ethnic groups such as Latinos Unidos and Asian Student Association, to sports such as Robotics and Bowling.

The academic teams at Redmond High School include Knowledge Bowl, Science Olympiad, Math, DECA, Mock Trial, Model UN, Orca Bowl, Programming (or Computer Science), and Speech and Debate.  RHS Knowledge Bowl teams are known for excellence at the state level and consistently place at state competitions, most recently winning 7th and 8th place at the state tournament. In 2014, the Redmond High School Orca Bowl team also enjoyed great success placing second at the state level. The RHS Model UN debuted at the Washington State Model UN (WASMUN) Conference at Seattle University in 2011. The RHS Feminism club made their debut in 2014, followed by the RHS ACLU club in 2017.

The DECA Class also operates the Student Store, and since 2008, has sent at least 10 participants to the International Career Development Conference per year. The Student Store closed in 2014.

Athletics
Redmond High School's sports department participates in the Washington Interscholastic Activities Association's Kingco Athletic Conference, at the 4A level. Redmond had previously been a member of the Kingco 4A level from 1997 to 2015, was moved to 3A for the 2016-2018 cycle after 22 schools chose to opt up to 4A, and returned to 4A for the 2018-2019 season.  Redmond offers 14 varsity sports as well as cheerleading and dance teams.

Sports offered:
 fall: Cross Country (Coed), Football (Boys), Tennis (Boys), Golf (Boys), Soccer (Girls), Swimming (Girls), and Volleyball (Girls)
 winter: Basketball (Boys, Girls), Wrestling (Coed), Swimming (Boys), and Gymnastics (Girls)
 spring: Track and Field (Boys, Girls), Soccer (Boys), Baseball (Boys), Golf (Girls), Badminton (Girls), Softball (Girls), and Tennis (Girls)

School spirit

Redmond High School's mascot is the Mustang, and the school colors are predominantly dark green and gold, though in most ceremonies and events black is also included. A customary tradition against the only real rival of RHS, Eastlake High School, is to completely wear black at the "Black Out" sporting events. Fan participation cheers are also a tradition at the games. A spectator 'wave', dubbed the 'Roller Coaster' and a group jump known as 'Truckin' are favorites.

Redmond High School Pep Band is organized yearly to play at home football and basketball games. Three students (one for football and two for basketball) are selected as Pep Band Directors, though only the football director is known as Drum Major. New and popular songs are added by request of the students and staff. The current fight song (2003-) is set to the Blazing Saddles theme, with lyrics written by band director Andy Robertson. The former fight song was set to the University of Wisconsin–Madison's fight song, On, Wisconsin!.

The school newspaper, The Blaze, is written by the Newspaper class and distributed in color. In 2014, a group of graduating seniors distributed a parody of The Blaze titled "The Laze" as a senior prank, facetiously emulating the newspaper's style and tendencies.

Campus
The Redmond High School campus is centered in one large building containing academic classrooms, a student cafeteria, a central courtyard, three gymnasiums, and a performing arts center.  The B Wing extension, added in 2012, includes several additional classrooms.  Several portable classrooms are also set up in close proximity to the main building.

For athletics, Redmond High School maintains Walter L. Seabloom field which accommodates both football and track & field events.  The campus has two additional open grass fields, baseball and softball fields, and six tennis courts.  For aquatic events, Redmond High School utilizes Redmond Pool which is across the street from the main campus.

Notable alumni

 Michael Conforto - 2013 Pac-12 Baseball Player of the Year, drafted by the New York Mets in the 1st round of the MLB Draft.
Barns Courtney - Singer 
 Jeff D'Amico - former MLB player (Kansas City Royals)
 Mike Duncan - Podcaster and author best known for The History of Rome and Revolutions
 Brian Falkenborg - former MLB player (Baltimore Orioles, Los Angeles Dodgers, San Diego Padres, St. Louis Cardinals)
 Trevor Guyton - Former NFL Draft Pick (Minnesota Vikings)
 Rick Jacobson - Film Director
 Pedram Javaheri - Meteorologist, CNN International Weather Anchor
 Jadon Lavik - CCM singer-songwriter
 Scott Macartney - Olympic & World Cup alpine ski racer
 Robert Munn - Olympic Rower
 Tom Niedenfuer - former MLB pitcher (Los Angeles Dodgers, Baltimore Orioles, Seattle Mariners, St. Louis Cardinals)
 Scott Rockenfield - Drummer of Queensrÿche
 Andy Sisco - former MLB player (Kansas City Royals, Chicago White Sox)
 Adora Svitak - child prodigy, activist, and author
 Nick Thune - Comedian
 Kirill Ustinov - Political expert
 Cody Votolato - Waxwing (band)/The Blood Brothers (band)/Jaguar Love
 Tony Wu - Mathematical prodigy

References

External links
 Lake Washington School District's profile for Redmond High School
 Redmond High School's Annual School Report for 2005-2006
 Real time chart of power generated by school's solar panels

High schools in King County, Washington
Public high schools in Washington (state)
Schools in Redmond, Washington
Educational institutions established in 1964
1964 establishments in Washington (state)